A cup is an open-top container  used to hold hot or cold liquids for pouring or drinking. Although mainly used for drinking, it also can be used to store solids for pouring (e.g., sugar, flour, grains, salt). Cups may be made of glass, metal, china, clay, wood, stone, polystyrene, plastic, aluminium or other materials, and are usually fixed with a stem, handles, or other adornments. Cups are used for quenching thirst across a wide range of cultures and social classes, and different styles of cups may be used for different liquids or in different situations. Cups of different styles may be used for different types of liquids or other foodstuffs (e.g. teacups and measuring cups), in different situations (e.g. at water stations or in ceremonies and rituals), or for decoration.

History
Cups are an obvious improvement on using cupped hands or feet to hold liquids . As such, they have almost certainly been used since before recorded history, and indeed, they have been found at archaeological sites throughout the world. Prehistoric cups were sometimes fashioned from shells and hollowed out stones.

In ancient Mesopotamia, cups were made for a variety of purposes, possibly including the transportation and drinking of alcoholic beverages.

There is evidence that the Roman Empire used cups throughout Europe, with notable examples including silver cups in Wales and a color-changing glass cup in ancient Thrace. In England, cups have been discovered which date back to several thousand years, including the Rillaton Gold Cup, about 3,700 years old. Cups were used in the Americas several centuries prior to the European arrivals. Around the Gulf of Mexico, Native American societies used the Horse conch for drinking cups, among other purposes.

Cultural significance and use

Since cups have been an integral part of dining since time immemorial, they have become a valued part of human culture. The shape or image of a cup appears in various places in human cultures.

Monarchy
Historically, monarchs have been concerned about assassination via poisoning.  To avoid this fate, they often used dedicated cups, with cup-bearers to guard them.  A "divining cup" was supposed to be able to detect poison.  In the Bible, Joseph interpreted a dream for Pharaoh's cup-bearer, and a silver divining cup played a key role in his reconciliation with his brothers.

Spa cups are special cups that are used to drink mineral or thermal water directly from a spring, developed in north-west Bohemia during the 17th century and are now part of Czech folklore.

Religion

In the Christian ritual of Communion, adherents drink from a cup of wine (or a wine substitute) to commemorate the Last Supper of Jesus.  A chalice is often used for this purpose.

Ancient Greek religious practices included libations. The rhyton was one cup used for libations.

Cuisine
The measuring cup, an adaptation of a simple cup, is a standard tool in cooking that has been in use at least as far back as Roman times. Apart from serving as drinking vessels, cups can be used as an alternative to bowls as a receptacle, especially, for soup. Recipes have been published for cooking various dishes in cups in the microwave.

Heraldry
Chalices are sometimes used in heraldry, especially ecclesiastical heraldry. A Kronkåsa is a type of elaborate wooden cup which was used by the Swedish nobility during the Renaissance.

Child development
Drinking from a cup is a significant step on a baby's path to becoming a toddler; it is recommended that children switch from bottles to cups between six months and one year of age. Sippy cups are typically used for this transition.

Sports

Many trophies take the form of a decorated cup. In cases such as the FIFA World Cup and the Stanley Cup, the competition itself may grow to take on the name of the trophy that is awarded to the winner. Owing to the common usage of cup-shaped trophies as prizes for the winners, a large number of national and international competitions are called "cups".

Games
In Tarot divination, the suit of cups is associated with the element of water and is regarded as symbolizing emotion, intuition, and the soul. Cards that feature cups are often associated with love, relationships, fears, and desires.

Various cups have been designed so that drinking out of them without spilling is a challenge. These are called puzzle cups.

 Pythagorean cup
 Fuddling cup
 Puzzle jug

The cup game involves rhythmically striking plastic cups.

Promotion
In the developed world, cups are often distributed for promotional purposes. For example, a corporation might distribute cups with their logo at a trade show, or a city might hand out cups with slogans promoting recycling. There are companies that provide the service of printing slogans on cups.

Types
Names for different types of cups vary regionally and may overlap. Any transparent cup, regardless of actual composition, is called a "glass"; therefore, while a cup made of paper is a "paper cup", a transparent one for drinking shots is called a "shot glass", instead.

For hot beverages

While in theory, most cups are well suited to hold drinkable liquids, hot drinks like tea are generally served in either insulated cups or porcelain teacups. 
 Coffee cup
 Mazagran
 Mug
 Teacup
 Thermos
 Travel mug
 Moustache cup

Disposable
Disposable cups are intended to be used only once. They are often used by fast-food restaurants and coffee shops to serve beverages.  Institutions that provide drinking water, such as offices and hospitals, may also use disposable cups for sanitary reasons.
 Paper cup
 Plastic cup
 Glass cup
 Foam cup

For alcoholic beverages
Some styles of cups are used primarily for alcoholic beverages such as beer, wine, cocktail, and liquor. There are over a dozen distinct styles of cups for drinking beer, depending on the precise variety of beer.  The idea that a certain beer should be served in a cup of a certain shape may have been promulgated more for marketing purposes, but there very well may be some basis in fact behind it. Wine glasses also come in different shapes, depending on the color and style of wine that is intended to be served in them.

 Beer stein
Pint glass
 Old Fashioned glass
 Quaich
 Sake cup (ochoko)
 Shot glass
 Tankard
 Wine glass
 Goblet

For measurement, suction and breasts

Measuring cup
 Suction cup
 Bra cup

Gallery

References

External links
 
 Gallery of cups in The Metropolitan Museum of Art

Drinkware
Teaware
Containers
Pottery